Debbrich Feys (born 20 December 1984, in Ghent) is a retired professional Belgian tennis player. Her career high singles ranking is World No. 341, which she achieved in March 2008. Her highest doubles ranking is No. 178, achieved in February 2008.

Biography
Feys turned professional after playing in the first round of the 2005 Hasselt Open – Ladies' Doubles Event, losing in round 1.
 
In her career, Debbrich won 7 ITF Women's Circuit titles- 1 in singles and 6 in doubles. She played on the WTA Tour on numerous occasions.

Debbrich participated at the 2008 Canara Bank Bangalore Open Doubles Event, but was eliminated in Round 1 with Angelika Bachmann, against Ji Chunmei and Sun Shengnan.

She started playing tennis at the age of nine. Her preferable surface is hard. Debbrich also enjoys swimming and running.

Feys last match 2009 played. She retired from tennis 2014.

ITF finals

Singles: 3 (1–2)

Doubles Finals: 13 (6–7)

References

External links
 
 

Living people
1984 births
Belgian female tennis players
Sportspeople from Ghent
21st-century Belgian women